The Priory Group is a provider of mental health care facilities in the United Kingdom. The group operates at more than 500 sites with over 7,000 beds. Its flagship hospital is the Priory Hospital, Roehampton, which is best known for treating celebrities particularly for drug addiction. The Priory Group also manages schools, some for students with autism spectrum disorders through Priory Education and Children’s Services. Some of its facilities are run by its subsidiary Partnerships in Care. In January 2019 it opened its first overseas school in partnership with the Abu Dhabi Department of Education and Knowledge.

Ownership
In 1980 the Priory Hospital in Roehampton was acquired by Community Psychiatric, an American healthcare company, and became the first clinic in what was to become the Priory Group.

The Priory Group was the subject of a management buyout, funded by Mercury Asset Management and several banks, in 1994.

In 2000 Westminster Healthcare Group (a company owned by Dr Chai Patel) acquired Priory Hospitals from the management team and from Mercury Asset Management for £96 million.

In 2002, the company was the subject of another management buyout, this time led by Doughty Hanson & Co, for £289 million. The company was divested to ABN AMRO (later acquired by the Royal Bank of Scotland Group) in July 2005 for £875 million, netting the five company directors over £50 million.

Advent International took control for an aggregate consideration of £925 million in 2011.

In October 2014, former Chief Executive, Tom Riall announced that the group was planning a significant expansion into the mental health community services market and would bid in partnership with “incumbent” NHS providers, an approach that would allow them to come up with new models of care. Anticipating more services to be put out to tender by Clinical commissioning groups, he noted that Priory could contribute "considerable commercial bidding expertise” and become the “overflow provider of choice” for the NHS.

Acadia Healthcare bought the business for £1.3 billion in January 2016 and sold it to Waterland Private Equity for £1.1 billion in January 2021.  Waterland plans to join it with MEDIAN of Germany "to create Europe’s leading rehabilitation and mental health services provider", especially in neurology and other post-acute services.

Performance
After the suicide of a 14-year old girl, Amy El-Keria, funded by the NHS, at the group’s Ticehurst House hospital in East Sussex in 2012, a prosecution was brought by the Health and Safety Executive. The company pleaded guilty to a charge of being an employer failing to discharge its duty to ensure people were not exposed to risk. It faced a fine of at least £2.4 million. The inquest jury found that the staff had failed to dial 999 quickly enough, had failed to call a doctor promptly and were not trained in CPR.

Its hospital in High Wycombe, a 12-bed low-security unit for young people with learning disabilities or autism, which opened in April 2018 was closed in February 2019 after the Care Quality Commission rated it inadequate and said the staff lacked appropriate experience and skills.  The company said that it could not recruit "an experienced, settled team of core nursing and clinical staff.”  The CQC rated three units run by Priory Group inadequate.

Two of its hospitals, Kneesworth House in Hertfordshire and Priory Hospital Blandford, were rated “inadequate” by the Care Quality Commission in July 2019.  Admissions to Priory Hospital were suspended “until further notice”. The greatest problems at Kneesworth house were on the forensic wards.  Ellingham Hospital, in Attleborough was rated inadequate in November 2019.  According to Priory “the fundamental issue . . . was structural: there are simply not enough skilled staff in the region to meet the highly specialised needs of the young people at Ellingham”.  88.2% of its 93 mental healthcare facilities in the UK have received the equivalent of good or better ratings.

St John’s House  near Diss in Suffolk, a 49-bed hospital for adults living with learning disabilities and associated mental health issues was put in special measures in March 2021 after  the Care Quality Commission rated it inadequate and accused staff of failing to ensure patients’ safety or dignity.

Notable patients

The following is alphabetical list of notable people whom The Priory Group has treated:
Craig Charles, actor
Richey Edwards, musician and songwriter
Paul Gascoigne, footballer
Michael Johnson, footballer
Justin Hawkins, singer
Steven Walters, footballer

See also
Private healthcare in the United Kingdom

References

External links
 The Priory Group
 

Addiction organisations in the United Kingdom
Health care companies of the United Kingdom
Private providers of NHS services